Kevin Short may refer to:

Kevin A. Short (born 1960), American painter
Kevin M. Short (born 1963), American mathematician and entrepreneur
Kevin Short (American football) (born 1992), American football cornerback
Kevin Short (bass-baritone), American opera singer
Kevin Short (RNZAF officer)